Mechanics Mill is an historic cotton textile mill located at 1082 Davol Street in Fall River, Massachusetts.

The mill was constructed in 1868 from red brick, in the Italianate style. The mill's octagonal tower originally had a highly decorative top, that has been removed. The mill office was once located in front of the mill along Davol Street, but has also been removed.

The Mechanics Mill company was incorporated on May 25, 1868, by a special charter granted by the Massachusetts Legislature. Thomas J. Borden served as the first president and D.H. Dyer was treasurer. Along with the Merchants Mill established in 1867, the Mechanics Mill was formed by a large number of stock holders with small means, beginning a new trend in the development of new corporations in the city. There were initially 328 stockholders, compared to a dozen or so with other mills at the time.

The mill was constructed north of the city center, along the waterfront with a tidewater dock to receive coal shipments to feed its boilers. Water for the steam engines was obtained from a well shaft dug nearby. The Mechanics Mill was also one of the first in the city to have a fire sprinkler protection system.

In 1929 the Mechanics Mill merged with the nearby Weetamoe Mill, but was soon closed.  It was later part of Quaker Fabric Corporation, which closed in 2007.

The mill experienced a rebirth in 2012 as Commonwealth Landing, including office space, several small stores and two restaurants, including Jerry Remy's Sports Bar & Grill, owned by Fall River native, former Boston Red Sox second baseman and current NESN sportscaster Jerry Remy.

The mill was added to the National Historic Register in 1983.

See also
National Register of Historic Places listings in Fall River, Massachusetts
List of mills in Fall River, Massachusetts

References

Textile mills in Fall River, Massachusetts
Industrial buildings and structures on the National Register of Historic Places in Massachusetts
National Register of Historic Places in Fall River, Massachusetts